Carlotta Addison (July 1849 – 1914) was an English actress. Stage appearances included leading roles in original productions of plays by T. W. Robertson, W. S. Gilbert, H. J. Byron and Arthur Wing Pinero.

Life
Addison was born in Liverpool in 1849, the younger daughter of Edward Phillips Addison, a comedian; the actress Fanny Addison was her sister. She first appeared on stage at the Liverpool Amphitheatre. Her London debut was in October 1866 at St James's Theatre, as Lady Frances Touchwood in The Belle's Stratagem by Hannah Cowley. Later that year she created the role of Adina in the musical burlesque Dulcamara, or the Little Duck and the Great Quack, by W. S. Gilbert, at the St James's Theatre. She later joined the company of the New Royalty Theatre, and in February 1868 appeared in Daddy Grey by Andrew Halliday, as Jessie Bell, the central figure of the play.

The Prince of Wales's Theatre

Later the same year she joined the company of Squire Bancroft and his wife Marie Wilton at the Prince of Wales's Theatre and appeared in a revival of Society, by T. W. Robertson, as Maud Hetherington. In January 1869 at the same theatre she played Bella in the first production of Robertson's School.  A reviewer in The Daily Telegraph (25 January 1869) wrote that Addison "in showing the good qualities of the pupil-teacher revealed some rare excellencies. ... There was not the slightest exaggeration in the display of her emotion, and the exquisite love scene in the third act, so full of purity and tenderness, owed much of its effect to the discreetly subdued style in which it was acted by Miss Addison and Mr. H. J. Montague."

In April 1870 she appeared at the same theatre in the first production of Robertson's M. P. as Ruth Daybrooke.

The Globe Theatre and later
In October 1871, at the Globe Theatre, she appeared in a leading role in the first production of Partners for Life by H. J. Byron. Further appearances at the same theatre were in 1872 in the first production of Forgiven by James Albery; in a revival of Cyril's Success by H. J. Byron; and in February 1873 in the first production of Oriana by James Albery.

In October 1875, at the Haymarket Theatre, she took the role of Ethel Grainger in Married in Haste by H. J. Byron. A reviewer in The Athenaeum (9 October 1875) wrote: "So concentrated and intense was the manner in which she displayed feeling, without going outside the bounds of social custom, that a high position might reasonably be predicted for her as an exponent of realistic drama."

She married in September 1876 Charles A. La Trobe. In the following years her stage appearances were fewer. At the Prince of Wales's Theatre in 1877 she was in a revival of London Assurance by Dion Boucicault, as Grace Harkaway; at the Haymarket Theatre in 1878 she was in Sheridan's The Rivals, as Julia. In 1881, she played Minnie Simperson in Engaged, by W. S. Gilbert, at the Royal Court Theatre. From 1888, she played Ruth Rolt in two long runs of Sweet Lavender by Arthur Wing Pinero at Terry's Theatre.

In 1910 she appeared in the film The Blue Bird (based on the play by Maurice Maeterlinck) as The Fairy.

Addison died in 1914.

References

Sources

External links
 
 

1849 births
1914 deaths
19th-century English actresses
20th-century English actresses